This article lists important figures and events in Malaysian public affairs during the year 1983, together with births and deaths of notable Malaysians.

Incumbent political figures

Federal level
Yang di-Pertuan Agong: Sultan Ahmad Shah
Raja Permaisuri Agong: Tengku Ampuan Afzan
Prime Minister: Dato' Sri Dr Mahathir Mohamad
Deputy Prime Minister: Dato' Musa Hitam
Lord President: Azlan Shah

State level
 Sultan of Johor: Sultan Iskandar (Deputy Yang di-Pertuan Agong)
 Sultan of Kedah: Sultan Abdul Halim Muadzam Shah
 Sultan of Kelantan: Sultan Ismail Petra
 Raja of Perlis: Tuanku Syed Putra
 Sultan of Perak: Sultan Idris Shah II
 Sultan of Pahang: Tengku Abdullah (Regent)
 Sultan of Selangor: Sultan Salahuddin Abdul Aziz Shah
 Sultan of Terengganu: Sultan Mahmud Al-Muktafi Billah Shah
 Yang di-Pertuan Besar of Negeri Sembilan: Tuanku Jaafar 
 Yang di-Pertua Negeri (Governor) of Penang: Tun Dr Awang Hassan
 Yang di-Pertua Negeri (Governor) of Malacca: Tun Syed Zahiruddin bin Syed Hassan
 Yang di-Pertua Negeri (Governor) of Sarawak: Tun Abdul Rahman Ya'kub
 Yang di-Pertua Negeri (Governor) of Sabah: Tun Mohd Adnan Robert

Events
 23 January – The VIP platform in Batu Caves, Selangor collapsed during Thaipusam.
 February – Malaysia officially occupied the Layang-Layang Islands or "Swallow Reefs" atolls, one of the Spratly Islands. A naval base and resort was later built at this location.
 10 May – The International Islamic University Malaysia (IIUM) was established.
 7 May – The Perusahan Otomobil Nasional Berhad (PROTON) was established.
1 July – Bank Islam Malaysia (BIMB), Malaysia's first Islamic bank was founded.
1 September – A Malaysian named Siow Woon Kwang was among the victims in Korean Air Lines Flight 007 that was shot down by a Soviet interceptor jet and crashed near Moneron Island, Soviet Union, killing all 269 passengers.
18 December – An Airbus A300 (OY-KAA) leased from Scandinavian Airlines as Malaysia Airlines Flight 684 crashed 2 km short of the runway at Subang Airport on a flight from Singapore. There were no fatalities, but the aircraft was written off.

Births
10 March – Che'Nelle – R&B singer
30 April – Yeoh Ken Nee – Diver
1 May – Wong Mew Choo – Badminton player
26 August – Nicol Ann David – Squash player
14 September - Liyana Fizi - singer-songwriter
27 September – Fazura – Actress

Deaths
19 January – Ahmad Boestamam – Malay author and nationalist
31 March – James Beveridge Thomson – first Lord President of the Supreme Court of Malaysia
25 April – Salmah Ismail (Saloma) – Wife and widow of Malaysian film actor, director singer, and songwriter P. Ramlee

See also
 1983
 1982 in Malaysia | 1984 in Malaysia
 History of Malaysia

References

 
Years of the 20th century in Malaysia
Malaysia
Malaysia
1980s in Malaysia